Muddy Run is a  tributary of the Maurice River in southwestern New Jersey in the United States.

It flows in a generally southeastern direction through southern Gloucester County.

See also
List of rivers of New Jersey
Muddy Run (Maurice River) (section)
Begins at Palatine Lake and next Travels South East To Cenertion Lake. Then on To Parvin State Park and Parvin Lake.  All Are In Salem County Including, The Last Lake in The Muddy Run Chain. is Known As Rainbow Lake.  Approximately  3 More Miles South, it Joins into The Maurice River, Where it Also Passes Into Cumberland County at A Place Long Known as Indian Head. Inden Head Was Named Due To The Numerous Arrow Heads Found At That Location and it Was Also Known As A  Tribal Meeting Location For The Various Native American Indian Tribes MManitaco Manumuskin That Traveled These River Highways in  Early America.

References

External links
Parvin State Park
Also Is Rainbow Lake NJ Landis Avenue Vineland To Bridgeton NJ  Rt 56

Rivers of New Jersey
Tributaries of the Maurice River
Rivers of Salem County, New Jersey